West Goshen is a census-designated place (CDP) in Tulare County, California. The 2010 United States census reported West Goshen's population was 511.

Geography
According to the United States Census Bureau, the CDP covers an area of 1.2 square miles (3.0 km), all of it land.

Demographics
At the 2010 census West Goshen had a population of 511. The racial makeup of West Goshen was 276 (54.0%) White, 2 (0.4%) African American, 10 (2.0%) Native American, 7 (1.4%) Asian, 0 (0.0%) Pacific Islander, 195 (38.2%) from other races, and 21 (4.1%) from two or more races. Hispanic or Latino of any race were 358 people (70.1%).

The whole population lived in households, no one lived in non-institutionalized group quarters and no one was institutionalized.

There were 139 households, 68 (48.9%) had children under the age of 18 living in them, 66 (47.5%) were opposite-sex married couples living together, 25 (18.0%) had a female householder with no husband present, 8 (5.8%) had a male householder with no wife present.  There were 15 (10.8%) unmarried opposite-sex partnerships, and 1 (0.7%) same-sex married couples or partnerships. 25 households (18.0%) were one person and 6 (4.3%) had someone living alone who was 65 or older. The average household size was 3.68.  There were 99 families (71.2% of households); the average family size was 4.36.

The age distribution was 168 people (32.9%) under the age of 18, 73 people (14.3%) aged 18 to 24, 126 people (24.7%) aged 25 to 44, 107 people (20.9%) aged 45 to 64, and 37 people (7.2%) who were 65 or older.  The median age was 26.4 years. For every 100 females, there were 115.6 males.  For every 100 females age 18 and over, there were 117.1 males.

There were 143 housing units at an average density of 121.4 per square mile, of the occupied units 72 (51.8%) were owner-occupied and 67 (48.2%) were rented. The homeowner vacancy rate was 1.4%; the rental vacancy rate was 4.3%.  269 people (52.6% of the population) lived in owner-occupied housing units and 242 people (47.4%) lived in rental housing units.

References

Census-designated places in Tulare County, California
Census-designated places in California